Ken Watters is an American jazz trumpeter residing in Huntsville, Alabama.  He is the brother of noted jazz trombonist, Harry Watters.  Ken is a member of several noted performing groups, including Tabou Combo, Natalie Cole Band, the Magic City Jazz Orchestra, Ray Reach and Friends and the W. C. Handy Jazz All-Stars.  He attended the University of North Texas, where he participated in the famed Lab Band program and studied trumpet with internationally renowned teacher Leonard Candelaria.  Later, Ken pursued further trumpet studies in New York City with Lew Soloff and Wynton Marsalis.

Ken's most recent CD release was by his own Haitian-Caribbean influenced jazz septet, RIYEL. The group's self-titled debut CD was released internationally on Summit Records . His latest musical project is an ongoing venture co-led alongside vocalist Ingrid Felts, called "Watters-Felts Project. The jazz-oriented sextet, based in Huntsville, Alabama, is made up of six of the most in-demand musicians in the southeast, including pianist Keith Taylor, bassist Abe Becker, percussionist Darrell Tibbs, drummer Marcus Pope, plus Felts & Watters. Ken is currently an adjunct professor at University of Alabama in Huntsville, where he directs the UAH Jazz Ensemble I.

Discography
The Jungle (1986)
Brothers* (1999)
Brothers II* (2000)
Southern Exposure (2001)
Brothers III* (2003)
RIYEL (2010)

External links
Watters Brothers website
Ken Watters at Myspace.com

American jazz trumpeters
American male trumpeters
Living people
Musicians from Atlanta
1964 births
21st-century trumpeters
21st-century American male musicians
American male jazz musicians
Summit Records artists